The 1927 Brooklyn Robins had another bad year. They tied a National League record on May 21 by using five pitchers in the eighth inning.

Offseason 
 January 9, 1927: Burleigh Grimes was traded by the Robins to the New York Giants as part of a three-team trade. The Philadelphia Phillies sent Butch Henline to the Robins and George Harper to the Giants. The Giants sent Jack Scott and Fresco Thompson to the Phillies.
 March 29, 1927: Mickey O'Neil was purchased from the Robins by the Washington Senators.

Regular season

Season standings

Record vs. opponents

Notable transactions 
 May 3, 1927: Bob McGraw was traded by the Robins to the St. Louis Cardinals for Jake Flowers.

Roster

Player stats

Batting

Starters by position 
Note: Pos = Position; G = Games played; AB = At bats; H = Hits; Avg. = Batting average; HR = Home runs; RBI = Runs batted in

Other batters 
Note: G = Games played; AB = At bats; H = Hits; Avg. = Batting average; HR = Home runs; RBI = Runs batted in

Pitching

Starting pitchers 
Note: G = Games pitched; IP = Innings pitched; W = Wins; L = Losses; ERA = Earned run average; SO = Strikeouts

Other pitchers 
Note: G = Games pitched; IP = Innings pitched; W = Wins; L = Losses; ERA = Earned run average; SO = Strikeouts

Relief pitchers 
Note: G = Games pitched; W = Wins; L = Losses; SV = Saves; ERA = Earned run average; SO = Strikeouts

Notes

References 
Baseball-Reference season page
Baseball Almanac season page
Retrosheet

External links 
1927 Brooklyn Robins uniform
Brooklyn Dodgers reference site
Acme Dodgers page 

Los Angeles Dodgers seasons
Brooklyn Robins season
Brooklyn
1920s in Brooklyn
Flatbush, Brooklyn